Samuel Leigh was a bookseller and publisher in 19th century London. His office stood on the Strand. From around 1806 to 1814 he conducted business with James Mathews in the partnership of "Mathews and Leigh." He also married Mathews' daughter. Leigh died by his own hand in 1831.

Leigh's travel guides
In the 1820s–1830s Leigh issued a series of eponymous travel guide books to Europe. He also published travel writing by authors such as Edmund Boyce, Johann Gottfried Ebel, Edward Planta, Heinrich August Ottokar Reichard, Mariano Vasi.

See also
 James Mathews Leigh, son of Samuel Leigh

Further reading
 
 
  + index

Leigh's travel guides
  + Index
 
  + Index
 
 
  + Index
 
  + Index
 1834 ed.
 
 
  + Index

References

External links
 WorldCat. Samuel Leigh
 WorldCat. Mathews and Leigh

British booksellers
Businesspeople from London